An expanded granular sludge bed (EGSB) reactor  is a variant of the upflow anaerobic sludge blanket digestion (UASB) concept for anaerobic wastewater treatment. The distinguishing feature is that a faster rate of upward-flow velocity is designed for the wastewater passing through the sludge bed. The increased flux permits partial expansion (fluidisation) of the granular sludge bed, improving wastewater-sludge contact as well as enhancing segregation of small inactive suspended particle from the sludge bed. The increased flow velocity is either accomplished by utilizing tall reactors, or by incorporating an effluent recycle (or both). A scheme depicting the EGSB design concept is shown in this EGSB diagram.

The EGSB design is appropriate for low strength soluble wastewaters (less than 1 to 2 g soluble COD/l) or for wastewaters that contain inert or poorly biodegradable suspended particles which should not be allowed to accumulate in the sludge bed.

See also
Anaerobic digester types
Biogas
List of wastewater treatment technologies
Water pollution

References

Anaerobic digester types
Environmental engineering
Water treatment